Eloquens™ is a Text-To-Speech software, whose first version was released in 1993 by CSELT. It was the first commercial speech synthesis software able to speak Italian.

Description 
It was the first commercial product of the research center CSELT in the field of voice technology: it was built with diphone-technology aimed to reach a high computational efficiency. As a result, the produced voice is still "robotic", but more natural than the previous generation voice implemented in MUSA by CSELT itself. In the past, ELOQUENS was applied to automatically read timetables in the Italian train stations and some telephone services provided by Telecom Italia, e.g. the automated address book service.

Nowadays, it is released as freeware: it is nowadays typically used in spoken comments in many YouTube videos.

See also 
 Loquendo
 vidby
 Acapela

References

Bibliography 
 Billi, R., Canavesio, F., Ciaramella, A., & Nebbia, L. (1995). Interactive voice technology at work: The CSELT experience. Speech communication, 17(3-4), 263-271.
 Balestri, M., Lazzaretto, S., Salza, P. L., & Sandri, S. (1993). The CSELT system for Italian text-to-speech synthesis. In Third European Conference on Speech Communication and Technology.
 Nebbia, Luciano, Silvia Quazza, and P. Luigi Salza. "A specialised speech synthesis technique for application to automatic reverse directory service." Interactive Voice Technology for Telecommunications Applications, 1998. IVTTA'98. Proceedings. 1998 IEEE 4th Workshop. IEEE, 1998.
 Baggia, Paolo, Giuseppe Castagneri, and Morena Danieli. "Field trials of the italian arise train timetable system." Speech Communication 31.4 (2000): 355-367.

External links 
 Eloquens on Softonic
 Datasheet Archive: Eloquens 2000

Speech synthesis software
Applications of artificial intelligence
Computational linguistics
History of human–computer interaction